Jean-Claude Mourlevat (born March 22, 1952, in Ambert) is a French writer, known for his fairy-tale, fable, and fantasy-inspired novels intended for young people, for which he has won multiple awards, including the Astrid Lingren Memorial Award.

Biography 
Mourlevat was born March 22, 1952, in Ambert, the fifth of six children, and the son of a miller and homemaker. He spent his childhood in Auvergne, where he "helped tend the family farm, where they raised cows, pigs, rabbits, and hens."

Beginning in 1962, he attended the Blaise Pascal boarding school, where he "spent eight years at a boarding school...[;]  the rules were harsh, the teachers strict and he felt constantly homesick and unhappy. He has said in interviews that literature became his salvation." He later evoked this part of his life in an autobiographical novel Je voudrais rentrer à la maison.

He continued his higher education in Strasbourg, Toulouse, Bonn, and Paris. He obtained a secondary degree in German, a language he taught from 1976 to 1985, first at a school in La Bourboule, then in Hamburg, and finally at a college in Cany-Barville, where he remained for 5 years.

Following his time in Cany-Barville, Mourlevat devoted himself to theatre.After spending time performing as a mime, clown, and actor, he  moved on to directing plays before devoting himself to writing.

In 1997, Mourlevat published his first novel, Histoire de l'enfant et de l'œuf. He is the author of La Rivière à l'envers, L'Enfant Océan, La Balafre, Le Combat d'Hiver, and Le Chagrin du roi mort, among others. Several of Mourlevat's novels have won literary prizes from juries of young readers or adults, such as the Prix des Incorruptibles and the Prix Sorcières. Mourlevat's books have been translated into nearly thrity languages, including Braille.

In late 2019, Mourlevat attended a six-week "Room with a View" writing residency in San Francisco, funded by the Institut français.

Mourlevat presently lives lives near Saint-Étienne with his wife (Rachel) and their two children.

Awards and honors 

In 2021, Mourlevat won the Astrid Lindgren Memorial Award.

Publications

Original publications 
 Histoire de l’enfant et de l’oeuf, Illustrated by Fabienne Teyssèdre, Mango, 1997
La Balafre, Pocket Junior, 1998
A comme voleur, Pocket Jeunesse, 1998
Le jeune loup qui n’avait pas de nom, Illustrated by Jean-Luc Bénazet, Milan, 1998
Kolos et les quatre voleurs, Illustrated by Isabelle Chatellard, Flammarion, 1998
L’Enfant océan, Pocket Jeunesse, 1999
Le voyage de Zoé, Bordas, 1999
Le petit royaume, Mango, 2000
La rivière à l’envers: Tomek, Pocket Junior, 2000
Regarde bien, Nathan, 2001
La rivière à l’envers: Hannah, Pocket Junior, 2002
La ballade de Cornebique, Gallimard Jeunesse, 2004
Sous le grand banian, Rue du Monde, 2005
Le combat d’hiver, Gallimard Jeunesse, 2006
La prodigieuse aventure de Tillman Ostergrimm, Illustrated by Marcelino Truong, Gallimard Jeunesse, 2007
Les billes du diable, Bayard Poche, 2008
Le chagrin du roi mort, Gallimard Jeunesse, 2009
Terrienne, Gallimard Jeunesse, 2011
Silhouette, Gallimard, 2013
Sophie Sholl: Non á la lâcheté, Actes Sud Junior, 2013
Aristide, Bordas, 2014
Le garçon qui volait, Illustrated by Marcelino Truong, Gallimard Jeunesse, 2015 (Previously published under the title La troisième vengeance de Robert Poutiffard, 2003)
L'homme qui levait les pierres, Thierry Magnier, 2015
L'homme qui ne possédait rien, Thierry Magnier, 2015

Jefferson, Illustrated by Antoine Ronzon, Gallimard Jeunesse, 2018

Translations 

Mourlevat's books have been translated to over twenty languages, including Catalan, Chinese, English, Estonian, Georgian, German, Italian, Japanese, Korean, Lithuanian, Romanian, Russian, and Spanish. The following is an incomplete list of English translations.

 The Pull of the Ocean (Original title: L'enfant océan), Translated by Y. Maudet, Delacorte Press, 2006. 
 Winter Song (Original title: Le combat d’hiver), Translated by Anthea Bell, Walker Books, 2008 (Also published as Winter’s End, Candlewick, 2009).
 Jefferson, Illustrated by Antoine Ronzon, Translated by Ros Schwartz, Andersen Press, 2020

References

External link 

 Official website
 Mourlevat's Instagram

1952 births
20th-century French writers
21st-century French writers